Amy Hunt (born 15 May 2002) is a British sprinter who won double gold at the 2019 European Athletics U20 Championships in both the 200 metres and 4 x 100 metres relay. A precocious junior, Hunt holds the world record for the Women's Under-18 200 metres, set in June 2019 with a time of 22.42s.

Running career
In June 2019, Hunt rose to prominence when she ran in a 200m junior race in Mannheim, Germany, in what was her fifth competitive race outdoors at that distance. Her time of 22.42s was a new world record for Under-18 women.

In the summer of 2019, she won gold medals in both the 200m and 4x100m at the European Under-20 Championships. Her transition into senior athletics was then disrupted by Covid-19, and then a serious leg injury in early 2022. Following surgery, she returned to the track in late 2022, finishing fourth in 23.45 in a mixed 200m race won by Yasmin Liverpool in 23.10.

International competitions

Nominations
She was named by the British Athletics Writers' Association as the "young female athlete of 2019".

In January 2020, Hunt was listed by British Vogue as one of their "Faces Set To Define The Decade Ahead".

References

External links
 
 
 Profile of Amy Hunt on BBC Sport
 Hunt tweet after world record U-18 run  
 Video on Twitter of Hunt running 22.42s at Mannheim meeting

British female sprinters
Living people
Place of birth missing (living people)
2002 births
People educated at Kesteven and Grantham Girls' School
Sportspeople from Newark-on-Trent
Sportspeople from Nottinghamshire
21st-century British women